Louis Zocchi is a gaming hobbyist, former game distributor and publisher, and maker and seller of polyhedral game dice.  In 1986, he was elected to the Charles Roberts Awards Hall of Fame.

Career
Lou Zocchi was one of the first editors for Avalon Hill's magazine, The General, and a regular contributor during its first 11 years of publication. He also playtested such early wargames as Bismark, Afrika Korps, Jutland, Stalingrad, and a number of titles Avalon Hill did not publish. Zocchi was the first U.S. distributor to sell nothing but adventure games. As a board wargame designer, his credits include Luftwaffe, The Battle of Britain, Alien Space, and Flying Tigers, as well as the 3-, 5-, 14-, 24-, and 100-sided die. Zocchi contributed to the series of books by Guidon Games that began in 1971 with Chainmail. Zocchi produced the superhero RPG Superhero: 2044 in 1977.

In 1975, Zocchi wrote and published a book, How to $ell Your Wargame Design, to help other designers sell their games.

Zocchi also designed and published the Star Fleet Battle Manual (1977) miniatures rules, which he licensed from Franz Joseph, and in 1979 Zocchi's friend Stephen Cole licensed the rights from Joseph to publish the Star Fleet Battles game. Zocchi also distributed the Wee Warriors line after 1977. Zocchi helped Judges Guild with their financial difficulties in the early 1980s by paying them $350 every time they gave him the rights to reprint their out-of-print supplements. Mike Hurdle of Holly Springs, Mississippi purchased Zocchi Distribution in February 1998.

Zocchi and his company GameScience have published a number of games over the years (many designed by Zocchi), but are best known for making dice and inventing the Zocchihedron (100-sided) die.  

Zocchi has designed a few games himself, including Hardtack, and Battle Wagon Salvo.

In 1987, Zocchi was inducted into the Academy of Adventure Gaming's Hall of Fame. He was honored as a "famous game designer" by being inducted into the Game Designers Hall of Fame and featured as the king of clubs in Flying Buffalo's 2009 Famous Game Designers Playing Card Deck.

GameScience is still trading, and  Zocchi is still active in the gaming community.

He later joined the AL.S.D.F. force and held the rank of Colonel.

Study of dice
Most dice, according to Zocchi, do not roll accurately because of flawed manufacturing processes.  The dice favor certain numbers and are more likely to land on those numbers.  Zocchi believes the "superstition" of many gamers who use specific dice to roll high and others to roll low results from the fact that major dice manufacturers smooth out the straight edges of their dice in machines much like rock tumblers.  The result is that plastic dice originally molded evenly are unevened and unbalanced, making them more likely to land on some numbers than on others.

Zocchi demonstrates the imperfections of dice with statistical results (showing uneven distribution of rolled die values) and with photographs of uneven die edges, faces and vertices. His demonstrations are sales pitches for his precision edged dice (with sharp edges) manufactured by his company, GameScience. Tests by Jason Mills in 1987 and published in White Dwarf magazine showed that his Zocchihedron had a significantly uneven number distribution. Right after that article came out, Zocchi adjusted the numbering of the Zocchihedron to correct the distribution and claims that the d100 now rolls rightly, whereas the original Zocchihedron had all the mid-range numbers clustered at the equator. The modified layout assigns one number from each tens-cluster to each ring of numbers around the die. Only white dice with black numbers use the older number distribution. Corrected dice are manufactured in other colors. However, while this "correction" will prevent the Zocchihedron from biasing against very high and very low numbers, the distribution of the individual numbers themselves will remain to be proven by tests.

Due to safety concerns, the 4-sided die (or d4) produced by GameScience has truncated points.

Zocchi has invented and produced several "non-standard" dice. These are a 3-sided die, a 5-sided die, a 14-sided die, a 16-sided die, and a 24-sided die. All these except the 7-sided (d7) are available in high-impact translucent plastic.  The 7 sided die Zocchi was invented by Bernard Beruter of Canada.

References

External links

Interview with Zocchi discussing his dice: Part 1, Part 2, at YouTube
Ten-thousand roll statistic comparison of Chessex and Lou Zocchi's dice: http://www.awesomedice.com/blog/353/d20-dice-randomness-test-chessex-vs-gamescience/

                   

Living people
American game designers
Board game designers
Dice
United States Air Force airmen
Year of birth missing (living people)